The Women's Six Nations Championship, known as the TikTok Women's Six Nations for sponsorship purposes, is an international rugby union competition contested between six European women's national teams. It started in the 1995–96 season as the Home Nations, with four teams: England, Ireland, Scotland and Wales.

In the 1998–99 season it became the Five Nations, with France joining the original four. The following season, Spain replaced Ireland for two seasons.

In 2001–02 the women's Six Nations competition was born with England, France, Ireland, Scotland, Spain and Wales playing, after Ireland rejoined the competition. Spain, at that time, were higher ranked than Italy and therefore deserved their place in the competition on merit.

In 2006, a championship trophy was commissioned from silversmith Thomas Lyte, to be followed by a second trophy commissioned for the Under 20 Six Nations championship. Designed and created by Thomas Lyte, the trophies are made from sterling silver and feature engraving detail with the logos of the competing countries.

In 2007, the Six Nations committee formally adopted Italy as the sixth national team member in the championship, replacing Spain. The women’s competition this came in parallel with the men's competition.

England have been the dominant team in the competition, winning 18 of 27 editions entering 2023. France is next with six titles.

Results

Overall

Home Nations (1996–1998)

Five Nations (1999–2001)

Six Nations (2002–present)

Final positions

Tables

Home Nations (1996–1998)

Five Nations (1999–2001)

Six Nations without bonus point scoring (2002–2016)

Six Nations with bonus point scoring (2017–)

Total

Highest team scores
Wins by 80 points or more:
 v Scotland (89–0) at Twickenham 08/03/2011 [523]
 v Spain (86–3) at Madrid 11/02/2006 [523]
 v Wales (83–11) at Swansea 10/04/1999 [239]
 v Wales (81–0) at Cardiff Arms Park 04/02/2005 [476]
 v Scotland (80–0) at Twickenham 16/03/2019 [1308]

See also
Women's international rugby - includes all women's international match results
Rugby Europe Women's Championship, competition for other European nations

References

External links
 Official Women's Six Nations site

 
Recurring sporting events established in 1996